Melanothrix nymphaliaria is a moth in the family Eupterotidae. It was described by Francis Walker in 1866. It is found on Java, Sumatra and Borneo and possibly also in the Philippines. The habitat consists of lowland forests.

References

Moths described in 1866
Eupterotinae
Insects of the Philippines